Druh Farrell (born 1958 or 1959) is a municipal politician who formerly served as Councillor for Ward 7 in Calgary, Alberta. She was first elected in 2001.

Career before politics
Prior to being elected in 2001, Farrell was a fashion designer and clothing manufacturer, and served as board member of the Hillhurst-Sunnyside Community Association and chair of the Hillhurst Sunnyside Planning and Development committee, co-founder and chairwoman of the Inner-City Coalition, and manager of the Kensington Business Revitalization Zone Association.

Electoral record

2001 municipal election
Farrell was first elected to represent Ward 7 for a 3-year term by winning 44% of the vote.

2004 municipal election
Farrell was reelected to serve Ward 7 in 2004 for a 3-year term by acclamation, having run unopposed.

2007 municipal election
Farrell handily won reelection to represent Ward 7 in 2007 for a 3-year term by taking 69% of the vote.

2010 municipal election
Farrell was reelected to serve Ward 7 in the 2010 election for a 3-year term, taking 43% of the votes in a closely contested battle over runner-up Kevin Taylor, who took 38%.

2013 municipal election
Farrell was reelected to represent Ward 7 in the 2013 election for a 4-year term by capturing 37% of the votes. In 2nd place with 28% was Kevin Taylor, followed closely by Brent Alexander with 26%.

2017 municipal election
Farrell was reelected to serve Ward 7 in the 2017 election for a 4-year term with 41.0% of the vote. Her only close competitor in This election was Brent Alexander, who garnered 37.5%.

2021 municipal election
On February 22, 2021, Farrell announced she would not be running for reelection in 2021.

31st Alberta general election 
On May 13, 2022, Farell won the nomination to become the Alberta NDP candidate for Calgary-Bow in the 31st Aberta general election.

Tenure as city councillor

Peace Bridge
The $24.5-million Peace Bridge designed by Santiago Calatrava on the Bow River between Eau Claire and Sunnyside, was a "controversial" project from its onset with many people considering it to be an "unnecessary extravagance." Farrell was a vocal supporter of the footbridge and as a result she "became the human shield at which many strangers directed their intense anger." On March 24, 2012, "thousands of Calgarians flooded onto the [bridge] to celebrate its opening." About 6,000 people use it daily. It quickly became a "tourist magnet"−the "most photographed structure in Calgary". It ranked among the top ten architectural projects and public spaces of 2012.

Walk21 Microgrants

The $172,500 Walk21 Community Microgrants Council Innovation Fund Application created by Farrell, Gian-Carlo Carra and Brian Pincott was approved by City Council on April 10, 2017. The program, which coincides with an international conference on walking hosted at the University of Calgary in September, will provide $112,500 for about 150 walking improvement community projects, which is about eight per ward to be completed by 2020. It celebrates Canada's 150th birthday. Photos of the arching rainbow under the LRT bridge by Kensington's Riley Park, one of the Walk21 Microgrants projects, were widely shared on Instagram.

Aquatic wheel chairs pilot project

Calgary’s Parks Department purchased three "water-hardy wheelchairs" which are currently available at Canmore, Rotary and South Glenmore/Variety splash parks as part of their accessibility initiative. Farrell had suggested the idea to Parks after she had heard about aquatic wheel chairs in an American water park.

Terrigno Law Suit

In May 2017, the Terrigno family served Farrell with a lawsuit related to a 2015 failed land use rezoning application regarding their building on the corner of 10th Street and Kensington Road. City Councillors voted to reject their application on May 11, 2015 with Farrell, Evan Woolley, Gian-Carlo Carra, Diane Colley-Urquhart, Richard Pootmans, Jim Stevenson, Brian Pincott and Naheed Nenshi voting against the Terrignos' application and Ward Sutherland, Andre Chabot, Peter Demong, Sean Chu, Joe Magliocca and Shane Keating voting for the rezoning. In June 2017, Farrell filed a "statement of defence, saying the [2017] lawsuit is intended to injure her reputation ahead of the October 2017 municipal election."  In February 2015, Mike Terrigno represented the family in the development zoning application at the Calgary Planning Commission meeting. Calgary Planning Commission's recommendation was that the re-zoning application should be refused.  Their application for the development of a 10-storey condo and commercial tower on the restaurant site provoked intense opposition from community planners. The meeting was called to an abrupt halt when "Terrigno's actions in the hallway prompted police complaints from community planners and a city hall security investigation following an exchange with a city employee." In 2010 Maurizio Terrigno opened a "giant Stampede party and entertainment tent" on the Osteria site which operated for the duration of the Stampede every year and which, according to Calgary Herald journalist Jason Markusoff, was "notoriously raucous." In their lawsuit, the Terrignos alleged that Farrell, whose private residence is very near the Osteria, "compelled" bylaw officers to monitor the Stampede party.

Vote Against New Communities
Along with Mayor Naheed Nenshi, Farrell was the only councillor to vote against a proposal for 14 new edge communities in July 2018.

Opposition from Save Calgary PAC
Farrell is one of five incumbents in the October 2017 Calgary elections, targeted with negative publicity by the newly formed Save Calgary political action committee (PAC), who also target councillors Gian-Carlo Carra, Diane Colley-Urquhart, Evan Woolley and Mayor Naheed Nenshi.

References

External links 
 City of Calgary Ward 7 homepage

Living people
Calgary city councillors
Year of birth missing (living people)
Canadian fashion designers
Canadian women fashion designers
Women in Alberta politics
Women municipal councillors in Canada